Judy Fong Bates (born December 22, 1949) is a Chinese-Canadian author. She is a 2006 recipient of the Alex Awards.

Biography
Born in Kaiping, Guangdong, she immigrated to Canada with her mother in 1955 to reunite with her father in Allandale, Ontario. The family subsequently moved to Acton, Ontario where she spent most of her adolescence, eventually graduating from Guelph Collegiate Vocational Institute. She obtained her Bachelor of Arts from the University of Guelph, later followed with a Bachelor of Education from the University of Toronto. She was a teacher with the Toronto Board of Education for twenty years, working at the Garden Avenue and Fern Avenue public schools, and has also taught creative writing at the University of Toronto and Trent University.

She currently resides with her husband on a farm near Toronto.

Works and honours
In 2005, she published Midnight at the Dragon Café, which was recognized in 2006 by the American Library Association as one of the year's notable books, and was subsequently honoured with an Alex Award in 2008, for having special appeal to young adults. In 2011, this book was chosen by the Toronto Public Library as the One Book Selection, as the single work that Torontonians should read within the year.

In 2010, The Year of Finding Memory was selected by The Globe and Mail as one of the top 100 books of the year.

Bibliography

Fiction

Non-fiction

References

External links 
 
 

Living people
21st-century Canadian novelists
Canadian women novelists
Canadian writers of Asian descent
Canadian people of Chinese descent
People from Kaiping
Canadian writers of young adult literature
1949 births
21st-century Canadian women writers
Women writers of young adult literature